The Philadelphia Phillies are a Major League Baseball team based in Philadelphia, Pennsylvania. They  are a member of the Eastern Division of Major League Baseball's National League. The team has played officially under two names since beginning play in 1883: the current moniker, as well as the "Quakers", which was used in conjunction with "Phillies" during the team's early history. The team was also known unofficially as the "Blue Jays" during the World War II era. Since the franchise's inception,  players have made an appearance in a competitive game for the team, whether as an offensive player (batting and baserunning) or a defensive player (fielding, pitching, or both).

Of those  Phillies, 32 have had surnames beginning with the letter E, and 79 beginning with the letter F. Three of those players have been inducted into the Baseball Hall of Fame: second baseman Johnny Evers, who played for the Phillies during the 1917 season; right fielder Elmer Flick, who played four seasons for Philadelphia; and first baseman Jimmie Foxx, who was a Phillie during the 1945 season. Two players, Foxx and Del Ennis, are members of the Philadelphia Baseball Wall of Fame. During his 11-season career with Philadelphia (1946–1956), right fielder Ennis, a member of the 1950 team nicknamed the Whiz Kids, notched 634 extra-base hits and scored 891 runs. Foxx was inducted into the Wall of Fame for his contributions as a member of the Philadelphia Athletics.

Among the 59 batters in this list, left fielder Spoke Emery has the highest batting average, at .667; he hit safely two times in three career at-bats with Philadelphia. Other players with an average over .300 include Jim Eisenreich (.324 in four seasons), Flick (.338 in four seasons), Lew Fonseca (.319 in one season), and Ed Freed (.303 in one season). Ennis leads all members of this list in home runs and runs batted in, with 259 and 1,124, respectively. Flick's 29 home runs lead those players whose surnames start with F, although he had nearly twice as many triples (57); and he is followed closely by Pedro Feliz (26 home runs). Flick also leads those batters in runs batted in, with 377 in four years.

Of this list's 54 pitchers, six pitchers share the best win–loss record, in terms of winning percentage. Paul Erickson won two games for the Phillies without losing any, and five pitchers sport a 1–0 record: Tom Edens, Sergio Escalona, Paul Fletcher, Dana Fillingim, and Foxx, who pitched in nine games for the Phillies despite being primarily a first baseman. Flaherty owns the lowest earned run average (ERA), having appeared in one game, pitching  inning and allowing no runs for an ERA of 0.00. Among the pitchers who have allowed runs, the best ERAs belong to Foxx and Steve Fireovid, who each have an average of 1.59 earned runs allowed per game. Scott Eyre's 1.62 earned run average from his two seasons with Philadelphia are the best among the pitchers whose surnames begin with E. Jumbo Elliott (36 wins and 205 strikeouts) and Charlie Ferguson (99 wins and 728 strikeouts) are tops in those categories among their respective lists; the latter is also one of the ten Phillies pitchers who have thrown a no-hitter, doing so on August 29, 1885, the first in franchise history. Chick Fraser also accomplished the feat on September 18, 1903.

Two Phillies have made 30% or more of their Phillies appearances as both pitchers and position players. In addition to Flaherty's statistics listed above, Harry Felix batted .135 with two runs batted in as a third baseman while amassing a 4.85 ERA and striking out three as a pitcher.

Footnotes
Key
 The National Baseball Hall of Fame and Museum determines which cap a player wears on their plaque, signifying "the team with which he made his most indelible mark". The Hall of Fame considers the player's wishes in making their decision, but the Hall makes the final decision as "it is important that the logo be emblematic of the historical accomplishments of that player's career".
 Players are listed at a position if they appeared in 30% of their games or more during their Phillies career, as defined by Baseball-Reference.com. Additional positions may be shown on the Baseball-Reference website by following each player's citation.
 Franchise batting and pitching leaders are drawn from Baseball-Reference.com. A total of 1,500 plate appearances are needed to qualify for batting records, and 500 innings pitched or 50 decisions are required to qualify for pitching records.
 Statistics are correct as of the end of the 2010 Major League Baseball season.

References
General

Inline citations

E